The 2015 Men's World Junior Squash Championships is the men's edition of the 2015 World Junior Squash Championships, which serves as the individual world Junior championship for squash players. The event took place in Eindhoven in the Netherlands from 26 to 30 July 2015. Diego Elías won his second World Junior Open title, defeating Youssef Soliman in the final.

Seeds

Draw and results

Finals

Top half

Section 1

Section 2

Bottom half

Section 1

Section 2

See also
2015 Women's World Junior Squash Championships
British Junior Open Squash
World Junior Squash Championships

References

External links
Men's World Junior Championships 2015 official website
Men's World Junior Championships 2015 SquashInfo page
Draws and results World Junior Championships official website

World Junior Squash Championships
Wor
Men's World Junior Squash
Men's World Junior Squash
Squash tournaments in the Netherlands
International sports competitions hosted by the Netherlands